1957 Academy Awards may refer to:

 29th Academy Awards, the Academy Awards ceremony that took place in 1957
 30th Academy Awards, the 1958 ceremony honoring the best in film for 1957